Stylidium piliferum is a species of dicotyledonous plant from the genus Stylidium. It is found in Western Australia.

Subspecies 

This species has only a subspecies:

 S. p. minor
S. p. piliferum

References

External links 

piliferum
Flora of Western Australia